Brooks Patrick Wheelan (born August 21, 1986) is an American stand-up comedian, actor, writer, and podcaster. First breaking through as a cast member and writer for the NBC sketch comedy series Saturday Night Live during the 2013–2014 season, Whelan currently hosts the podcast Entry Level. He has also released a half-hour special for Comedy Central, acted in various movies and shows including Big Hero 6: The Series, and opened for John Oliver at numerous sets.

Early life and education
Wheelan was born in Cedar Rapids, Iowa, on August 21, 1986, and raised in Manchester, Iowa, the son of Chris and Jim Wheelan.

Growing up, his interest mostly focused on science and mathematics. He performed regularly in Iowa City during his college years. He graduated from the University of Iowa in 2009 with a biomedical engineering degree.

Career
Wheelan started performing stand-up comedy in his late teens in Iowa, then went to Kansas City and Chicago, before eventually moving to Los Angeles where he began to perform stand-up comedy full-time. Before joining Saturday Night Live, he performed stand-up comedy in Los Angeles while he had a job as a biomedical engineer, doing research on eyes and heart valves. In 2013, Wheelan was hired to write for Saturday Night Live for the 2013–2014 season and was made a cast member the week before the season started. After being fired from Saturday Night Live, Wheelan embarked on a stand-up tour entitled "The Brooks Wheelan Falls Back on Standup Comedy (Sorta) Tour", in reference to his firing. As part of his promotion for the tour he performed on Conan.

Wheelan's first stand-up comedy album This Is Cool, Right? was released on January 27, 2015 to critical acclaim. The Laugh Button called it "one of the best albums of 2015", while The A.V. Club wrote, "This Is Cool, Right? is at turns manic, honest, and completely absurd. Brooks crafts jokes not unlike sketches, and has an ear for storytelling that finds universal truths in the examining of his personal life." As part of the promotion for the record, he appeared on Late Night with Seth Meyers. Wheelan also performed a stand-up set on a September 2015 episode of Comedy Central's The Half Hour.

Saturday Night Live
Wheelan was a recurring guest on Saturday Night Lives Weekend Update segment, using his stand-up stories as public service announcements against irresponsible behavior. On the Bruce Willis / Katy Perry episode, the commentary centered on having tattoos that have no meaning, with Wheelan showing off three tattoos he had in his youth: a tribal stamp on his left arm meant to look like the one Anthony Kiedis from Red Hot Chili Peppers has, a nautical star on his right arm, and a weird oceanscape on his side (which came from a doodle he drew in his freshman year of high school, and which does not make sense to him because he grew up in Iowa, which is not a coastal state). On the Anna Kendrick / Pharrell Williams episode, the commentary centered on the dangers of drinking alcohol, and the story of how his friends put butter down his pants while he was blacked out drunk and Wheelan worrying that he was dying of an undiscovered sexually transmitted disease.

On July 14, 2014, Wheelan announced through Twitter that he was no longer a cast member of Saturday Night Live, stating, "FIRED FROM NEW YORK IT'S SATURDAY NIGHT!". Shortly after his firing, Wheelan admitted that he was not angry and that he was still friends with some of the cast members, and also said that he prefers stand-up.

Impressions on Saturday Night Live
 Rand Paul
 Jared Leto
 Harry Styles
 Kid Rock
 Matthew McConaughey
 Slash
 Uncle Sam

Entry Level with Brooks Wheelan
On October 24, 2017, Wheelan launched the podcast Entry Level with Brooks Wheelan. In each episode, he interviews a guest on the often low-paying or undesirable jobs they had before they eventually achieved success in the entertainment industry.

Personal life
Brooks Wheelan went to Dubuque Hempstead High School in Dubuque, Iowa, where he was crowned homecoming king.

Filmography

Discography

References

External links

 

1986 births
Living people
American stand-up comedians
American male television actors
American sketch comedians
People from Manchester, Iowa
Male actors from Iowa
University of Iowa alumni
Actors from Cedar Rapids, Iowa
21st-century American male actors
21st-century American comedians
Comedians from Iowa